Shakeel Ansar (Punjabi, ; born 11 November 1978) is a first-class Pakistani cricketer. He is a wicketkeeper-batsman bowler who bats right handed. He has represented Zarai Taraqiati Bank Limited, Pakistan Customs, Khan Research Laboratories; and Sialkot Stallions. He has selected for Twenty20 International (T20I) series against Sri Lanka in 2012 season.

He was the leading run-scorer for Zarai Taraqiati Bank Limited in the 2018–19 Quaid-e-Azam One Day Cup, with 246 runs in five matches.

References

External links

1978 births
Cricketers from Sialkot
Living people
Pakistani cricketers
Pakistan Twenty20 International cricketers
Gujranwala cricketers
Sui Northern Gas Pipelines Limited cricketers
Zarai Taraqiati Bank Limited cricketers
Sialkot cricketers
Pakistan Customs cricketers
Sialkot Stallions cricketers
Multan Sultans cricketers
Wicket-keepers